Yusvinsky District is an administrative district (raion) of Komi-Permyak Okrug of Perm Krai, Russia; one of the thirty-three in the krai. Municipally, it is incorporated as Yusvinsky Municipal District. It is located in the center of the krai. Its administrative center is the rural locality (a selo) of Yusva. Population:  The population of Yusva accounts for 23.9% of the district's total population.

Geography
About 70% of the district's territory is covered by forests.

History
The district was established on February 25, 1925.

Demographics
Ethnic composition (as of the 2002 Census):
Komi-Permyak people: 54.3%
Russians: 43.2%

Economy
The economy of the district is based on agriculture and forestry.

See also
Zhiginovo

References

Notes

Sources

Districts of Perm Krai
Komi-Permyak Okrug
States and territories established in 1925